Baruc is the name of an electoral ward in Barry, Vale of Glamorgan, Wales. It covers the southern area of the town, including Barry Island, Cold Knap and the area around Romilly Park.

The ward elects three county councillors to the Vale of Glamorgan Council and three councillors to Barry Town Council. The ward is currently represented by Plaid Cymru.

According to the 2011 census the population of the ward was 10,621.

In 2022 the number of county councillors was increased from two, to three, as a result of recommendations from the Local Democracy and Boundary Commission for Wales.

Election results
On 4 May 2017 the Baruc ward re-elected two Plaid Cymru councillors to the County Council. On 15 May councillor Nic Hodges, also a town councillor, was elected as the first Plaid Cymru mayor of Barry, the first mayor to represent the Baruc ward for 35 years.

1973–1996
At the 1985, 1989 and 1993 county elections, prior to the creation of the Vale of Glamorgan county, Baruc elected a county councillor to South Glamorgan County Council. The Conservative candidate won each of these elections.

Baruc (or Barruc) was also an electoral ward to the Vale of Glamorgan Borough Council between 1973 and 1996. Until 1983 it elected three councillors (all Conservative), from the 1983 election the ward elected two councillors (again, all Conservative).

References

Vale of Glamorgan electoral wards
Electoral wards of South Glamorgan
Barry, Vale of Glamorgan